is a former Japanese football player.

Club career
Mogi was born in Fukushima on March 2, 1984. After graduating from high school, he joined J1 League club Sanfrecce Hiroshima in 2002. Although Sanfrecce repeated relegation to J2 League and promotion to J1, he got an opportunity to play as forward from first season. However he could not become a regular player and he could hardly play in the match from summer 2005. In 2006, he moved to J2 club Vissel Kobe. He played many matches and Vissel was promoted to J1 end of 2006 season. In 2007, he was converted to side back and played many matches as right and left side back. 

Although he could hardly play in the match for injury in 2008, he played as regular player as side back from 2009. However Vissel was relegated to J2 end of 2012 season. Despite Vissel conquered a promotion to J1 in 2013 season, his opportunity to play decreased from that year. In 2015, he returned to his local and joined J3 League club Fukushima United FC. He played many matches as forward and side back every season. He retired end of 2018 season.

National team career
In September 2001, Mogi was selected Japan U-17 national team for 2001 U-17 World Championship. He played as forward in all 3 matches. In November 2003, he was also selected Japan U-20 national team for 2003 World Youth Championship. He played as forward in all 5 matches.

Club statistics
Updated to 1 January 2019.

References

External links

1984 births
Living people
Association football people from Fukushima Prefecture
Japanese footballers
Japan youth international footballers
J1 League players
J2 League players
J3 League players
Sanfrecce Hiroshima players
Vissel Kobe players
Fukushima United FC players
Association football defenders
Association football forwards